Adnan Baig (born 19 May 1984) is a Pakistani first-class cricketer who played for Karachi cricket team.

References

External links
 

1984 births
Living people
Pakistani cricketers
Karachi cricketers
Cricketers from Karachi